Ang Thong (Thai: อ่างทอง, lit. Bowl of Gold) may refer to:

Places
Ang Thong Province
Mueang Ang Thong District
Ang Thong town
Mu Ko Ang Thong National Park, a group of islands and national park in Surat Thani Province
, Prachuap Khiri Khan province
, Phayao province
, Nakhon Sawan province
, Kamphaeng Phet province
, Ratchaburi province
, Surat Thani province
, Phatthalung province

Ships
, the former Royal Yacht Maha Chakri (II), a support ship of the royal Thai Navy in service from 1935 to 1945
, an LST-542-class tank landing ship of the Royal Thai Navy, in service from 1947 to 2006
 (791), an Endurance-class landing platform dock ship of the Royal Thai Navy, commissioned in 2012

Others
Angthong F.C., a football club based in Ang Thong